Events from the year 1970 in Pakistan.

Incumbents

Federal government
President: Yahya Khan 
Chief Justice: Hamoodur Rahman

Governors
Governor of Balochistan: Riaz Hussain (starting 1 July)
Governor of Khyber Pakhtunkhwa: K.M. Azhar Khan (starting 1 July)
Governor of Punjab: Attiqur Rahman (starting 1 July)
Governor of Sindh: Rahman Gul (starting 1 July)

Events

August
5 August, Pakistan International Airlines F27; Islamabad, Pakistan: The aircraft entered a steep dive and crashed about three minutes after a night takeoff in poor weather. All four crew members and 26 passengers were killed.

November
11 November, East Pakistan: The Bhola cyclone devastates the region, resulting in extreme loss of life.

December
7 December; 1970 Pakistani general election.
31 December; Pakistan International Airlines F27; East Pakistan: The aircraft lost altitude and impacted about  short of the runway. Seven of the 31 passengers were killed.

Statistics
 The city of Faisalabad has an estimated population of 726,000, while the capital Islamabad has an estimated population of 70,000.

See also
 1969 in Pakistan
 1971 in Pakistan
 List of Pakistani films of 1970
 Timeline of Pakistani history

 
1970 in Asia